This article show all participating team squads at the 2015 Women's Junior Pan-American Volleyball Cup, played by sixteen countries with the final round held in Dominican Republic

Teams

The following is the Argentinean roster in the 2015 Women's Junior Pan-American Volleyball Cup.

Head Coach:  Mauro Silvestre

References

Pan-American